Prathima Devi (9 April 1933 – 6 April 2021) was an Indian actress known for her work in Kannada films. Devi made her debut through the 1947 film Krishnaleela. She starred in the lead role in Jaganmohini (1951), the first Kannada film to complete 100 days at the box-office. She went on to appear in over 60 films.

Biography 
Devi was born as Mohini on 9 April 1933 in Kalladka, a town in the erstwhile South Canara region of Madras Presidency (in present-day Karnataka), to Upendra Shenoy and Saraswatibai, as the last of their four children. Devi lost her father when she was four or five years old; the family moved to Mangalore, then to Ahmedabad, where her brother-in-law ran a textile business, before settling in Udupi. It was here that Devi got hooked to watching films, with the role of M. S. Subbulakshmi as Naradar in the 1941 Tamil film Savithiri influencing her deeply in pursuing a career in acting.

Devi joined professional theatre at the age of 11 before entering films with Krishnaleela (1947). In the film, she shared screen with Kemparaj Urs while also meeting future husband D. Shankar Singh on its sets. She went on to appear in Jaganmohini (1951), which became the first Kannada film to complete a 100-day run at the theatres. Her Dallali (1952) alongside Makeup Subbanna was another major success. Most films she appeared in where produced by her husband under the banner Mahatma Films.

Devi had four children: son Rajendra Singh Babu is a film director, Sangram Singh and Jairaj Singh and daughter Vijayalakshmi Singh, an actress and producer. Devi died on 6 April 2021 at her residence in Saraswatipura, Mysore, aged 88.

Filmography

 Krishnaleela (1947)...Gopi
 Shiva Parvathi (1950)
 Jaganmohini (1951)
 Sri Srinivasa Kalyana (1952)
 Dallali (1952)
 Chanchala Kumari (1953)
 Muttidella Chinna (1954)
 Madiddunnu Maharaya (1954)
 Shivasharane Nambekka (1955)
 Prabhulinga Leele (1957)
 Mangala Sutra (1959)
 Shivalinga Sakshi (1960)
 Raja Satyavrata (1961)
 Bhakta Chetha (1961)...Gowri
 Sri Dharmasthala Mahathme (1962)
 Paalige Bandadde Panchamrutha (1963)
 Pathala Mohini (1965)
 Nagarahavu (1972)
 Nagakanye (1975)
 Narada Vijaya (1980)
 Bhaari Bharjari Bete (1981)
 Dharani Mandala Madhyadolage (1983)
 Rama Shama Bhama (2005)

Awards
 2001–02: Dr. Rajkumar Award by the Government of Karnataka

References

External links 
 

1933 births
2021 deaths
People from Udupi district
Indian film actresses
Actresses in Kannada cinema
Kannada actresses
20th-century Indian actresses